During World War I Imperial Germany funded or inspired a number of terrorist acts in America and abroad. It was hoped that these attacks would harm the war efforts of the Allies or Entente Powers. Spy heads like the American-based German Military Attaché Franz von Papen received money to fund these terrorist activities and distributed them to local actors or German agents. In 1917 the New York Times reported that there were 10,000 German, Austro-Hungarian, Bulgarian, and Ottoman agents in America. While most of the terrorist attacks were amateurish and foiled by local law enforcement, some like the Black Tom explosion caused immense devastation.

List of state-sponsored terrorist attacks
State-sponsored terrorism is government support of violent non-state actors engaged in terrorism. States can sponsor terrorist groups in several ways, including but not limited to funding terrorist organizations, providing training, supplying weapons, and hosting groups within their borders.  During WWI, Imperial Germany sponsored multiple terrorist attacks.

Lone Wolf attacks
A lone wolf attack is a particular kind of terrorist attack, committed in a public setting by an individual or group who plans and commits an act of terrorism inspired by another organization or state, in this case, Imperial Germany. However, instead of being directed to or paid to carry out the attack the planning and the implementation for it is independent of the German Empire.

See also

Terrorism in the United States
Great Phenol Plot

Bibliography 
Notes

References 

 - Total pages: 692

1916 crimes in the United States
1916 in New Jersey
Acts of sabotage 
Explosions in 1916
Explosions in New Jersey 
Terrorist incidents in the United States in the 1910s
United States home front during World War I 
State-sponsored terrorism
World War I crimes by Imperial Germany